Gaumee Itthihaad (GIP) was a political party in the Maldives headed by Dr. Mohammed Waheed Hassan, former President of Maldives, and the first Vice President of Maldives. The party was a generally pragmatic, and was part of the coalition including the former ruling party for the Republic of Maldives. Under the coalition agreement with the Maldivian Democratic Party, the GIP were awarded three seats in the cabinet; the Fisheries Ministry, the Education Ministry, and the Ministry for Economic Development and Trade, although these positions were revoked by the then-President in contravention of the coalition agreement.

The party was dissolved in 2013.

See also
The Republic of Maldives
Mohamed Nasheed

References

External links

Politics of the Maldives
Social democratic parties in Asia
Political parties established in 2008
Political parties disestablished in 2013